In set theory, 0† (zero dagger) is a particular subset of the natural numbers,  first defined by Robert M. Solovay in unpublished work in the 1960s. (The superscript † should be a dagger, but it appears as a plus sign on some browsers.) The definition is a bit awkward, because there might be no set of natural numbers satisfying the conditions. Specifically, if ZFC is consistent, then ZFC + "0† does not exist" is consistent. ZFC + "0† exists" is not known to be inconsistent (and most set theorists believe that it is consistent). In other words, it is believed to be independent (see large cardinal for a discussion). It is usually formulated as follows:

0† exists if and only if there exists a non-trivial elementary embedding  j : L[U] → L[U] for the relativized Gödel constructible universe L[U], where U is an ultrafilter witnessing that some cardinal κ is measurable.

If 0† exists, then a careful analysis of the embeddings of L[U] into itself reveals that there is a closed unbounded subset of κ, and a closed unbounded proper class of ordinals greater than κ, which together are indiscernible for the structure , and 0† is defined to be the set of Gödel numbers of the true formulas about the indiscernibles in L[U].

Solovay showed that the existence of 0† follows from the existence of two measurable cardinals. It is traditionally considered a large cardinal axiom, although it is not a large cardinal, nor indeed a cardinal at all.

See also 

0#: a set of formulas (or subset of the integers) defined in a similar fashion, but  simpler.

References

External links 
Definition by "Zentralblatt math database" (PDF)

Large cardinals